Deveral is a hamlet in the parish of Gwinear-Gwithian, Cornwall, England.

References

Hamlets in Cornwall